Stranded in Paris is a lost 1926 American silent comedy film starring Bebe Daniels and directed by Arthur Rosson. The film was produced by Famous Players-Lasky and distributed by Paramount Pictures.

Cast
Bebe Daniels as Julie McFadden
James Hall as Robert Van Wye
Ford Sterling as Count Pasada
Iris Stuart as Theresa Halstead
Mabel Julienne Scott as Countess Pasada
Tom Ricketts as Herr Rederson
Helen Dunbar as Mrs. Van Wye
Ida Darling as Mrs. Halstead
George Grandee as Pettipan
Andre Lanoy as Schwab

References

External links

Silent American comedy films
American silent feature films
Films based on short fiction
Films set in Paris
Films directed by Arthur Rosson
Lost American films
Paramount Pictures films
Films with screenplays by Herman J. Mankiewicz
American black-and-white films
1926 comedy films
1926 lost films
Lost comedy films
1920s American films
1920s English-language films